Isabella of Portugal (24 October 1503 – 1 May 1539) was the empress consort and queen consort of her cousin Charles V, Holy Roman Emperor, King of Spain, Archduke of Austria, and Duke of Burgundy. She was Queen of Spain and Germany, and Lady of the Netherlands from 10 March 1526 until her death in 1539, and became Holy Roman Empress and Queen of Italy in February 1530. She was the regent of Spain because of her husband's constant travels through Europe, focusing on the kingdom's policies independent of the Empire and managing the economy.

Childhood
Isabella was born in Lisbon on 24 October 1503 and named after her maternal grandmother (Isabella I) as well as her maternal aunt, who had been her father's first wife. She was the second child and first daughter of King Manuel I of Portugal and his second wife, Maria of Aragon. Isabella was second-in-line to the throne until the birth of her brother Luis in 1506. 

Isabella was educated under the supervision of her governess Elvira de Mendoza. Her studies included mathematics, Renaissance classics, the languages of Latin, Spanish and French besides her native Portuguese, etiquette, and the Christian doctrine. Isabella and her siblings were punished by their mother, "when they deserved it, without pardoning any of them." At the age of 14, her mother died. She and her sisters inherited her properties, plus the income from Viseu and Torres Vedras.

Engagement and marriage

As the eldest daughter of Manuel the Fortunate, Isabella was a rather attractive candidate for marriage. The ideal candidate for her husband was her first cousin Charles, son of Maria's sister, Joanna I of Castile and her husband Philip, Duke of Burgundy. Their marriage would bring a strong alliance between Spain and Portugal, in accordance with the wishes of their grandparents, Isabella I of Castille and Ferdinand II of Aragón. It would also facilitate the continued exploration of the oceans without incurring clashes, as Portugal was the only naval power that could challenge Spain's supremacy in the Atlantic ocean. Plus, as Charles was sovereign of multiple kingdoms, it was necessary that Portugal, Christendom's richest kingdom, would fall under Spain's orbit and not of France, which had happened in the War of Castilian Succession. Moreover, because he had been raised in Burgundy, the Spanish nobles and subjects reportedly insisted that he should marry a princess from the Iberian peninsula.

However, the 18-year-old Charles was in no hurry to marry and instead sent his sister Eleanor to marry Isabella's widowed father in 1518. Charles's Flemish advisors, especially William de Croÿ, later convinced him to relegate the Portuguese alliance to the background and replace it with an alliance with England. In 1521, Charles became engaged to his other first cousin, Mary Tudor, daughter of Henry VIII and Catherine of Aragon, who was 16 years younger than Charles and still a child. Their engagement sought to undo an alliance between England and France articulated by the ambitious Cardinal Thomas Wolsey. Many in Portugal took their Infanta's rejection as an offence, but Isabella remained determined that she would marry her powerful cousin or else enter a convent. By 1525, Charles was no longer interested in an alliance with England and could wait no longer for Mary to get older because he was determined to have legitimate children. His engagement was called off, the alliance with England was abandoned, and he finally sought to marry Isabella. There were many more advantages - she was closer to him in age (she was only 3 years his junior), fluent in Spanish, and offered a dowry of 900,000 Portuguese cruzados (or Castilian folds) which was more than enough to solve many of his financial problems brought on by the Italian War of 1521-26. 

Charles wasted no time in securing a papal dispensation for first cousins and the marriage contract for an alliance with Portugal were made - Isabella would marry him and her brother, King John III of Portugal, would marry Charles' youngest sister, Catherine of Austria. Charles intended to wed and then leave his future wife as regent to govern Spain while he went to Central Europe to deal with political and religious troubles there. In January 1526, Isabella traveled to Spain. Upon her arrival, she met the Duke of Calabria, the Archbishop of Toledo and the Duke of Béjar at the Spanish-Portuguese border. They escorted her to Seville, where she was to wait for Charles for a week. At the end, their wedding took place the very next day just after midnight on 11 March in the Palace of Alcázar of Seville. 

Although their marriage was a political arrangement, Isabella captivated Charles, who tarried with her longer than anticipated. They honeymooned for several months at the Alhambra in Granada, where he ordered the seeds of a Persian flower that had never been seen before in Spain. The seeds eventually grew into the red carnation, which delighted her. He then ordered thousands more to be planted in her honour, establishing the red carnation as Spain's floral emblem. Despite the mutual affection the couple shared, their marriage was not easy. His first absence lasted from 1529 to April 1533. He remained in Spain for 2 years, only to depart again in December 1536. Although he came back briefly in 1538, he left almost immediately, returning in November 1539. As agreed by the nobles, their children were raised in Spain. She supervised their education and taught them Portuguese. She wrote to her husband regularly, but often spent months without receiving letters.

Regency

As Charles had planned, he appointed Isabella regent of Spain during his absence from the peninsula to lead his military campaigns and attend the administration of his other kingdoms between 1529-33 and 1537–39. She attended meetings of the governing councils and consulted with the ministers. As time passed, she took a more active role in the policy-making process, suggesting her own solutions rather than merely accepting recommendations. Her husband considered her deliberations "very prudent and well thought out."

Economy
Isabella was a profound expert of the problems of the peninsular kingdoms, intransigently defending the good common to particular interests. At the external level, her sensible actions were decisive in the defence of the coasts of the peninsula and of North Africa, which were infested by piracy. This allowed the flow of precious metals and turned Spain into one of the chief sources of the imperial treasury. Through her regencies, she ensured that Spain remained independent of the empire's expensive military policies and thus relatively prosperous during her lifetime. However, Castile became integrated into Charles's empire and suffered from high inflation after her death. The enormous budget deficit accumulated and inflation during her husband's later reign resulted in declaring bankruptcy during the reign of their son Philip II.

Domestic and foreign relations
Isabella effectively defended the royal power in order to ensure the monarch's authority, as a response towards the previous rebellions against Charles for his foreign relationships. She traveled regularly in the autumn between Toledo, Valladolid, Seville, Barcelona and Majorca. To deal with important matters of the empire, the couple wrote to each other more regularly. In foreign policy, Isabella actively intervened in the negotiations of marital alliances between the French and Spanish royal families. She was very concerned that her own children wouldn't be forced to wed the much older offspring of King Francis I.

Death

During several years, Isabella and the court traveled from city to city, moving in part to avoid exposure to epidemics. There is speculation that she suffered from consumption, with a contemporary describing her: "The Empress is the greatest pity in the world, she is so thin that she does not resemble a person". In 1539, she became pregnant for the seventh time, but contracted another fever in the third month that caused antenatal complications and gave birth to a stillborn son. She died two weeks later on 1 May 1539 at the age of 35, without her husband present.

Charles was left so devastated that he couldn't bring himself to accompany his wife's body to the Royal Chapel of Granada, the burial place of the Catholic Monarchs. He instead instructed their son Philip to accompany his mother's body with Francis Borgia, 4th Duke of Gandía. Decomposition had so disfigured Isabella's body, however, that Gandía couldn't recognize her and was allegedly so horrified at what death had done to her beauty that he later became a Jesuit, gaining fame as San Francisco de Borja. Charles was so grief-stricken by her death that he shut himself in a monastery for 2 months, praying and mourning for her in solitude. He never recovered from her death and wore black for the rest of his life to show his mourning. He never remarried, though he had an affair long after her death that resulted in the birth of an illegitimate son, John of Austria. Charles died as a widower in 1558 while holding the same cross in his hand which she held in her hand when she died. 

In 1574, Isabella's body was transferred by her son to the Royal Monastery of San Lorenzo de El Escorial, where she was originally interred into a small vault along with her husband directly underneath the altar of the Royal Chapel. This was done in accordance with his last will and testament, in which he left a codicil asking for the establishment of a new religious foundation in which the couple would be reburied together side by side, "half-body under the altar and half under the priest's feet". They remained in the Royal Chapel while the famous Basilica of the Monastery and the Royal Crypt were still under construction. In 1654, after the Basilica and Royal Crypt were finally completed during the reign of their great-grandson Philip IV, the couple's remains were moved into the Royal Pantheon of Kings, which lies directly under the Basilica. On one side of the Basilica are bronze effigies of Charles and Isabella, with effigies of their daughter Maria of Austria and Charles's sisters, Eleanor of Austria and Maria of Hungary, behind them. Exactly adjacent to them on the opposite side of the Basilica are effigies of their son with three of his wives and their ill-fated grandson Carlos, Prince of Asturias.

Post-mortem tributes

In memory of Isabella, Charles commissioned several tributes through art and music, beginning in 1540 when he commissioned the Flemish composer Thomas Crecquillon to compose new music in honour of the Empress. Crecquillon composed his Missa Mort m'a privé as a memorial to her, which expresses her husband's grief and wish for a heavenly reunion with his beloved wife. Another musical tribute to her is Carole cur defles Isabellam that was composed in 1545 by the Franco-Flemish composer Nicolas Payen.

In 1543, Charles commissioned his favourite painter Tiziano Vecelli to paint posthumous portraits of Isabella by using earlier ones of her as his model. Tiziano painted several portraits of her, which included his Portrait of The Empress Isabel of Portugal and La Gloria. He later painted a double portrait of the imperial couple together, of which there is a copy by Peter Paul Rubens. Charles kept these portraits with him whenever he travelled and after he retired to the Monastery of Yuste in 1555.

Issue
Isabella had seven children with Charles, of whom 3 survived including King Philip II of Spain and Maria, another Holy Roman Empress.

Ancestry

Cultural depictions
Isabella of Portugal is portrayed by Blanca Suárez in the TVE series Carlos, Rey Emperador.

See also
Descendants of Isabella I of Castile and Ferdinand II of Aragon
Descendants of Manuel I of Portugal

References

Bibliography
 Isabella of Portugal (1503–1539)

|-

|-

|-

|-

|-

|-

1503 births
1539 deaths
People from Lisbon
16th-century Portuguese people
House of Aviz
Spanish royal consorts
Castilian queen consorts
Leonese queen consorts
Galician queens consort
Majorcan queens consort
Aragonese queen consorts
Countesses of Barcelona
Duchesses of Burgundy
Countesses of Burgundy
Countesses of Flanders
Duchesses of Brabant
Duchesses of Luxembourg
Duchesses of Limburg
Countesses of Artois
Countesses of Holland
Countesses of Hainaut
Portuguese people of Spanish descent
Regents of Spain
16th-century women rulers
16th-century women of the Holy Roman Empire
Holy Roman Empresses
Austrian royal consorts
Royal consorts of Naples
Royal consorts of Sicily
Italian queens consort
German queens consort
Deaths in childbirth
Burials in the Pantheon of Kings at El Escorial
Daughters of kings